The 1975 Big League World Series took place from August 9–16 in Fort Lauderdale, Florida, United States. For the second consecutive year, Taipei, Taiwan defeated San Antonio, Texas in the championship game.

Teams

Results

References

Big League World Series
Big League World Series